The 2013 Arab Youth Athletics Championships was the fourth edition of the international athletics competition for under-18 athletes from Arab countries. Organised by the Arab Athletic Federation, it took place in the Egyptian capital Cairo from 21–23 June. A total of forty events were contested, of which 20 by male and 20 by female athletes. The girls' steeplechase was contested for the first time, making the programme match that of the 2013 World Youth Championships in Athletics. The racewalking events were held on roads, rather than the usual track surface.

Egypt topped the medal table for a third straight edition through a total of 42 medals, thirteen of them gold. Algeria also won thirteen gold medals and had the second-highest total with 25. Tunisia ranked third with seven golds in its haul of 17, while Qatar was the next most successful nation with four golds in a total of twelve. Out of the fourteen participating nations, twelve of them reached the medal table. The competition had reduced participation, with Sudan, Syria, Jordan and all absent and Saudi Arabia sending a smaller contingent as compared to the 2009 edition, although Bahrain and Palestine returned at this event. Regional athletics power Morocco continued its hiatus since the first edition.

Three athletes completed individual doubles at the competition, all of them from the boys' side. Mahmoud Hamoudi won both the 100 metres and 200 metres, becoming the second male to do so after Abdullah Al-Sooli (2004). His Algerian teammate Yasser Mohamed Tahar Triki won both the long jump and triple jump, repeating the 2007 achievement by Ismail Al Saffar. Egypt's Mohamed Magdi Hamza claimed both the shot put and discus throw titles – a double Hamid Mansour had first completed in 2009.

A total of ten new championship records were set at the competition. Qatar sent its first female athlete, Sara Al Manai Ahmed, to the competition and she was runner-up in the javelin. Arab youth throws champion Mohamed Magdi Hamza went on to take a bronze medal at the 2013 World Youth Championships later that year.

Medal summary

Men

Women

Medal table

Participation

Absentees included Jordan, Morocco, Sudan, and Syria.

References

Results
4es Championnats Arabes D'Athletisme Cadets - Le Caire du 21 au 23.06.2013. Tunis Athletisme. Retrieved on 2015-05-31.

Arab Youth Athletics Championships
International athletics competitions hosted by Egypt
Sports competitions in Cairo
Arab Youth Athletics Championships
Arab Youth Athletics Championships
2010s in Cairo
2013 in youth sport
Athletics in Cairo